Siriano is a Tucanoan language of Colombia, with a few speakers in Brazil.

References

Languages of Colombia
Tucanoan languages